Figures in a Landscape, subtitled: People and Places; Essays: 2001-2016, is a collection of thirty essays, profiles, articles and book introductions all by Paul Theroux. The thirty pieces cover a wide variety of topics including authors, artists, celebrities, Africa, travel experiences, reading and the craft of writing.

This 2018 volume is a companion to earlier published collections of Theroux's essays and articles including 
Sunrise with Seamonsters (1985) and Fresh Air Fiend (2000).

Contents

Reception 

In the Irish Times Dervla Murphy found favor with "a superb set of musings on Graham Greene’s life and works."

In the New York Times Tom Zoellner said "What emerges [instead] is a portrait of an optimist with curiosity and affection for humanity in all its forms, as well as a ravenous appetite for the literary efforts of others."

Kirkus Review called it "A masterfully simple and satisfying collection."

In the Guardian Robert McCrum said "There are several highly entertaining essays here, and some quotably arresting lines, but the voice is elusive, unfixed and dissonant – an echo of the divisions within."

References 

Books by Paul Theroux
Houghton Mifflin books
2018 non-fiction books
Essay collections